Daredevil Kate is a lost 1916 silent feature film directed by Kenean Buel and starring Virginia Pearson. It was produced and distributed by Fox Film Corporation.

Cast
Virginia Pearson - Kate
Victor Sutherland - Cliff Stone
Mary G. Martin - Irene
Kenneth Hunter - John West
Alex Shannon - Green
Leighton Stark - Kilmer
Fred R. Stanton - Bently
Jane Lee - Irene's child
Katherine Lee - Irene's child
Minna Philips - Mrs. Stone

See also
1937 Fox vault fire

References

External links
 Daredevil Kate at IMDb.com

1916 films
Lost American films
Fox Film films
Films directed by Kenean Buel
American silent feature films
American black-and-white films
Silent American drama films
1916 drama films
1916 lost films
Lost drama films
1910s American films
1910s English-language films